Mei Yiqi or Mei Yi-chi (29 December 1889 – 19 May 1962), courtesy name Yuehan, was a Chinese politician, physicist and educator, who served two separate terms as Ministry of Education of the Republic of China, from 1948 to 1949 and from 1958 to 1961. He was President of National Tsinghua University between 1931 and 1948, making him the university's longest serving president.

Biography
Mei was born in Tianjin on 29 December 1889, to a merchant family. His father Mei Bochen was a small merchant. His ancestral home in Wujin District, Changzhou, Jiangsu Province. In 1904, at the age of 15, he attended Nankai School, becoming a student of Zhang Boling. He secondary studied at Baoding Higher School. In August 1909, he was sent to the U.S. as one of the first group of Boxer Indemnity Scholarship Program students. He received his bachelor's degree from the Worcester Polytechnic Institute. 

He returned to China after graduation in 1914 and worked in Tianjin Youth Association. In Autumn of that same year, he moved to National Tsinghua University, where he was elected President of National Tsinghua University in 1931. In December 1948, he was appointed Ministry of Education of the Republic of China, but having held the position for only one year. After the defeat of the Nationalists by the Communists in Chinese Civil War in 1949, Mei relocated to Taiwan. In July 1958, he was appointed Ministry of Education again, and concurrently served as President of National Tsing Hua University in Hsinchu City. In February 1962, he was elected an academician of the Academia Sinica.

On 19 May 1962, he died of cancer at National Taiwan University Hospital, in Taipei, Taiwan.

Personal life
Mei married Han Yonghua in 1919 in Tianjin. The couple had one son and four daughters: Mei Zutong, Mei Zufen, Mei Zuyan, Mei Zubin and Mei Zushan.

Works

Memorials
Mei was highly praised by teachers and students of Tsinghua University, "Mei Yiqi is the President of Tsinghua University forever." Mei was buried in National Tsing Hua University campus, his tomb was named "Garden of Mei".

References

External links
 
 

1889 births
1962 deaths
Tianjin Nankai High School alumni
Worcester Polytechnic Institute alumni
Educators from Tianjin
Presidents of Tsinghua University
Republic of China politicians from Tianjin
Physicists from Tianjin
Deaths from cancer in Taiwan
Chinese Civil War refugees
Taiwanese Ministers of Education
Education Ministers of the Republic of China
Members of Academia Sinica